Tiago José Bico Mota (born 12 November 1985) is a Portuguese retired football player.

Career

Club career
He made his professional debut in the Segunda Liga for Oriental on 9 August 2014 in a game against Santa Clara.

Later career
After a prolonged injury, 34-year old Mota retired at the end of 2019 and immediately became a part of the technical team of his last club U.D. Vilafranquense.

References

1985 births
Footballers from Lisbon
Living people
Portuguese footballers
Portuguese expatriate footballers
Atlético Clube de Portugal players
Nea Salamis Famagusta FC players
Clube Oriental de Lisboa players
U.D. Vilafranquense players
Liga Portugal 2 players
Cypriot Second Division players
Association football midfielders
Portuguese expatriate sportspeople in Cyprus
Expatriate footballers in Cyprus